Seychelles competed at the 1984 Summer Olympics in Los Angeles, United States.

Athletics

Men's 10,000 metres
 Albert Marie
 Qualifying Heat — 32:04.11 (→ did not advance, 41st place)

Women's 100 metres
 Marie-Ange Wirtz
 First Heat — 12.61 (→ did not advance, 44th place out of 46)

Women's Long Jump
Marie-Ange Wirtz
 Qualification — 5.21 m (→ did not advance, 23rd place)

Boxing

Four boxers represented Seychelles in 1984.

Men's Lightweight (– 60 kg)
 Jean-Claude Labonte
 First Round — Bye
 Second Round — Lost to José Hernándo (Spain) on points (0-5)

Men's Light-welterweight (– 63.5 kg)
 Ramy Zialor
 First Round — Bye
 Second Round — Lost to Jean-Pierre Mbereke-Baban (Cameroon) on points (0-5)

Men's Welterweight (– 67 kg)
 Basil Boniface
 First Round — Bye
 Second Round — Lost to Kieran Joyce (Ireland) referee stopped contest (head blow)

Men's Light-middleweight (– 71 kg)
 Ralph Labrosse
 First Round — Bye
 Second Round — Beat Pierre Mella (Cameroon) on points (4-1)
 Third Round — Lost to Gnohere Sery (Ivory Coast) on points (1-4)

References

Official Olympic Reports

Nations at the 1984 Summer Olympics
1984
1984 in Seychelles